QwameGaby is the stage name of Gabriel Kwame, a Ghanaian gospel singer and early proponent of the Ghanaian "Gospel" genre. He is employed by Tigo, a mobile network.

Born in Accra, he began making music in his early school days.  He studied at the Accra Academy School and then attended the Institute of Professional Studies, now  University of Professional Studies   in Accra. There he attained the CIM qualification from the Chartered Institute of Marketing UK,  and is currently a Chartered Marketer

Recognition and musical style 

QwameGaby began performing Ghana gospel music in June 2014 at the Kumasi Sports Stadium. His first hit single was "Wonderful God" featuring Cwesi Oteng, released in June 2014.
His second hit single was "Ogya" featuring D Black and produced by DJbreezy, released in September 2014.

Music videos 
 Wonderful God
 Ogya

Singles 
 "Wonderful God featuring Cwesi Oteng".
 "Ogya featuring D Black and produced by DJbreezy".

References 

 

21st-century Ghanaian male singers
21st-century Ghanaian singers
Living people
1985 births